Vice and Virtue (original French title: Le Vice et la Vertu) is a 1963 French drama war film starring Annie Girardot as Juliette (Vice), Robert Hossein as the sadistic German officer and Catherine Deneuve, in her first notable film role, as Justine (Virtue).

It was directed by Roger Vadim and inspired by some of Marquis de Sade's characters.

Plot
A war film where Catherine Deneuve holds her first notable role in the cinema (Justine, virtue). Annie Girardot plays Juliette (vice) and Robert Hossein plays the sadistic German officer.

Cast
Annie Girardot - Juliette Morand 
Robert Hossein - SS Colonel Schörndorf 
Catherine Deneuve - Justine Morand 
O.E. Hasse - General von Bamberg 
Philippe Lemaire - Hans Streicher 
Luciana Paluzzi - Helena 
Valeria Ciangottini - Manuela 
Astrid Heeren - Danielle 
Serge Marquand - Ivan 
Georges Poujouly - Lieutenant Hoech
Monique Messine - Anne
Jean-Daniel Simon - Ludwig

Reception
The film recorded admissions of 1,556,664 in France.

References

External links 
 
 

French World War II films
1963 films
Films directed by Roger Vadim
French war drama films
Films based on works by the Marquis de Sade
Western Front of World War II films
Women in prison films
1960s French films